is a passenger railway station located in the city of Ōtsu, Shiga Prefecture, Japan, operated by the West Japan Railway Company (JR West).

Lines

Station layout
The station consists of two opposed elevated side platforms with the station building underneath. The station is staffed.

Platforms

History
The station opened on 4 December 1988. The construction cost of the station was provided by Keihan Electric Railway, who developed the "Biwako Rose Town" residential area near the station. This is the only infill station that was added since the opening of the Kosei Line in 1974.

Station numbering was introduced in March 2018 with Ono being assigned station number JR-B24.

Passenger statistics
In fiscal 2019, the station was used by an average of 2901 passengers daily (boarding passengers only).

Surrounding area
 Otsu City Ono City Center
 Shiga Prefectural Road 558 Takashima Otsu Line 
 Onoimoko Park

See also
List of railway stations in Japan

References

External links

JR West official home page

Railway stations in Japan opened in 1988
Kosei Line
Railway stations in Shiga Prefecture
Railway stations in Ōtsu